Storm King Mountain is a mountain on the west bank of the Hudson River just south of Cornwall-on-Hudson, New York. Together with Breakneck Ridge on the opposite bank of the river it forms "Wey-Gat" or Wind Gate, the picturesque northern narrows of the Hudson Highlands. Its distinctive curved ridge is the most prominent aspect of the view south down Newburgh Bay, from Newburgh, Beacon, and the Newburgh-Beacon Bridge. It can also be seen by southbound travelers on nearby sections of the New York State Thruway. This view was a popular subject for early artists of the Hudson River School.

Name

During his initial voyage up the river, Henry Hudson and his crew named the mountain Klinkesberg, due to its wrinkled rock cliffs near the river.

Later, the early Dutch colonists of the region referred to the mountain simply as "Boterberg" (Butter Hill, since the mountain looked like a lump of butter; the English translation was later the common name for the mountain). During the middle of the 19th century, writer Nathaniel Parker Willis, who had become a resident in the region, proposed the name Storm King:

The section of New York State Route 218 that winds around the eastern slope of the mountain overlooking the River Hudson was named originally the Storm King Highway. That name is often used presently for the four-lane section of U.S. Route 9W to the west, with Route 218 referred to as the Old Storm King Highway.

History

During 1962 the mountain became the topic of an environmental controversy when local activists formed the Scenic Hudson Preservation Coalition (known presently simply as Scenic Hudson) to fight plans by utility Consolidated Edison to cut away part of the mountain near the river and build a pumped storage hydro-electric plant complete with transmission lines across the Hudson River for an ambitious power generating scheme which would also have entailed creating a reservoir in much of what is now Black Rock Forest. In a lawsuit brought by the coalition, Scenic Hudson Preservation Conference v. Federal Power Commission, a judge ruled for the first time that environmentalists had standing to challenge executive branch decisions in federal court. During 1979 Con Edison finally abandoned even a greatly reduced version of the project, and settled another lawsuit against their Indian Point facility by agreeing to regulate the operation of their Hudson River power plants so as to minimize the number of fish they killed and endow the Hudson River Foundation with $12 million.

After forest fires on the mountain during the dry summer of 1999, unexploded ordnance remaining from 19th century artillery tests and training at the nearby United States Military Academy was discovered in some areas close to the trails. As a result, hiking on the mountain was prohibited until October 2002, when authorities could be sure it had been removed safely.

On February 20, 2011, a NYPD helicopter rescued two Fourth Class "plebes" from the United States Military Academy nearby, who had stranded themselves 500 feet up on the southern cliff face while rappelling, when a New York State Police chopper proved unable to complete the task.

Hiking
The mountain is a major part of Storm King State Park. With wide views of the river and areas surrounding, both Storm King and Butter Hill summits are popular with hikers. The orange-blazed unnamed connector trail, leading to the yellow-blazed Stillman Trail, most often accessed at a parking area on U.S. Route 9W, offers an immediate and steep climb up Butter Hill followed by a longer and more relaxing hike to the summit of Storm King.

Although attempted infrequently and not permitted by the park authorities, there are documented technical rock climbing routes above the river, as well as ice climbing, when conditions are favorable.

Gallery

See also
 Bull Hill
 David Sive

References

External links

New York-New Jersey Trail Conference: Storm King State Park

Hudson Highlands
Mountains of New York (state)
U.S. Route 9W
Cornwall, New York
Protected areas of Orange County, New York
Palisades Interstate Park system
Mountains of Orange County, New York
Hudson River School sites